The Yale Bulldogs men's ice hockey team represents Yale University in New Haven, Connecticut and is the oldest collegiate ice hockey team in the United States. The Bulldogs compete in the Ivy League and the ECAC Hockey League (ECACHL) and play their home games at Ingalls Rink, also called the Yale Whale. The current head coach is Keith Allain, who led the Bulldogs to an Ivy League championship in his first year as head coach (2006–2007 season). Allain is assisted by former QU/UND goaltender, Josh Siembida.  On April 13, 2013, the Bulldogs shut out Quinnipiac 4–0 to win their first NCAA Division I Championship.

Team history

Origins: Malcolm Greene Chace

Financier Malcolm Greene Chace (Yale class of 1896) is credited with introducing ice hockey to the United States while a Yale student. Chace had been a tennis champion and avid player of ice polo, a game which predated hockey in the United States. In 1892, while competing in an international tennis tournament in Niagara Falls, New York, Chace was introduced to the game of ice hockey by members of Canada's Victoria Hockey Club. During the following Christmas break, Chace formed a team made up of Brown, Harvard, Cornell and Columbia students and played a ten-game schedule in Canada, with the goal of learning the Canadian game. After their tour, the students established hockey clubs at their respective schools.

Chace led the Yale team as captain in their game against Baltimore on February 14, 1896, winning 2–1. Over a century later in 1998, Yale established the position of Malcolm G. Chace Head Hockey Coach in his honor. A portrait of Chace hangs in The Schley Room at Ingalls Rink. The Malcolm G. Chace Award is given each year to the player who "best exemplifies leadership and the traditions of the sport at Yale".

Early history (1893–1963) 
The Yale Men's Ice Hockey team is the oldest existing intercollegiate ice hockey program in the United States, the program traces its roots back to 1893. Yale played its first intercollegiate match on February 1, 1896, against Johns Hopkins, resulting in a 2–2 tie.

In the early years of the program, the team played under the direction of captains in a player-coach role and team managers. Despite not having an official head coach, the team proved successful in the early years of the program playing various amateur athletic clubs and a growing number of intercollegiate teams at various schools in the Northeast. Yale won its first intercollegiate championship in the fourth season of the program in 1899 when the Bulldogs went 6–0 through the season. Yale continued its early success winning the intercollegiate championship in each of the next three seasons. On February 22, 1904, the Bulldogs played their 100th game at the St. Nicholas Rink in New York, a 2–5 loss against rival Harvard. The team won its 100th game on January 8, 1913, with a 6–0 shutout at Columbia.

Fred Rocque became the program's first head coach in the 1916–17 season, during which the team finished with ten wins and four losses. The following two seasons from 1917 to 1919, the team only played three games due to the World War. Following the break, Talbot Hunter took over as head coach for the 1919–20 season. Hunter's Yale team began the season on a five-game trip to Canada, the first time an American university would make such a trip. During the rest of the 1919–20 season and through the 1920–21 season Yale played home games in Philadelphia due to poor ice conditions at the Bulldogs home rink. Clarence Wanamaker took over as head coach after serving as the coach of Dartmouth from 1915 to 1920. Wanamaker would become the first multi-year head coach in program history and led the team from 1921 to 1928. In his sixth season, the 1926–27 season, ice hockey was given major sport status by the university. He led the program to a record high 18-win season in 1922–23 and followed that season with a 14-win season, the first back to back double digit-win seasons in program history.

The Quadrangular League was created for the 1933–34 with Harvard, Yale, Princeton and Dartmouth. The league is considered the predecessor to the Ivy League and ECAC Hockey. In 1936, the Council of Ivy Group Presidents agreed on the formal formation of the League, however the agreement did not go into effect until the 1955–56 season. Yale won the Hobey Baker Trophy, given to Quadrangular League champions in the 1934–35 season.

In 1938, the university hired former New York Rangers player, Murray Murdoch to take over the hockey program. Murdoch quickly turned the Bulldogs team around, after three consecutive losing seasons, he recorded back-to-back 10-win seasons followed by a 12-win and 14-win season. Seasons were shortened from 1942 to 1946 during World War II and following the war Army joined the Quadrangular League and it became known as the Pentagonal League in 1946–47. Army left the league after two season, but was replaced by Brown. In the 1951–52 season, the Bulldogs swept through the Pentagonal League with a 6–1–0 league record and finished the regular season 16–7–0. The team received a bid to the 1952 NCAA Ice Hockey Tournament. It was the first Frozen Four appearance by the university.  The four-team tournament, still in its early years, having first been played in 1948, was held at the Broadmoor Arena in Colorado Springs, Colorado. Yale lost to the hometown Colorado College Tigers but won the consolation game 4–1 over St. Lawrence to place third in the tournament. Murdoch guided Yale to its 500th program win in the 1953–54 season on March 3, 1954, in a 10–7 win over Providence.

In 1961 Yale and the other members of the Pentagonal League joined various other schools in New England to form the 28-team ECAC Hockey. After two seasons a number of the smaller programs split leaving the ECAC with the Ivy League schools and a number of other Division I programs. Murray Murdoch ended his tenure as Yale head coach after 27 seasons in 1965. Murdoch finished with a record of 271–234–20, lead the Bulldogs to two Hobey Baker Trophy Quadrangular League Championships, and the program's first NCAA Frozen Four appearance.

Taylor era (1976–2006) 

Tim Taylor, a 1963 Harvard graduate and Crimson assistant coach from 1969 to 1976 under Cooney Weiland, took over the Yale program in 1976 after a number of losing seasons, including the 1974–75 season when the team finished 1–21–1 (.065). With Taylor behind the bench, the program turned around and within two seasons Taylor lead the Bulldogs to a 14-win season. In the 1984–85 and 1985–86 seasons, Yale reached back-to-back 20-win seasons for the first time in program history. That same season, on November 15, 1986, Yale beat rival Harvard 7–5 to win the 100th game of the Taylor era. With the win he became the second Yale coach to win at least 100 games.

Yale won its first ECAC Regular Season Champion in the 1997–98 season. Despite losing in the ECAC Playoffs to Harvard, Yale received an at-large bid to the 1998 NCAA Ice Hockey Tournament. The Bulldogs lost in the opening round of the NCAA Tournament 0–4 to Ohio State. The Bulldogs finished the season setting a new program best record of 23–9–3 (.700). With the success of the season coach Taylor was named the national coach of the year in 1997–98 by the American Hockey Coaches Association. In 2001–02 Yale got their revenge against Ohio State when the Bulldogs beat the Buckeyes 6–2 in Columbus, Ohio, to win the university's 2,000th game.

Yale made the 2006 ECAC Playoffs and faced Union in the best-of-3 series first round series. After winning the first game 2–1 in overtime the second game of the series on March 4, 2006, was tied 2–2 at the end of regulation. 11th-seeded Yale eventually won 3–2 when David Meckler redirected a Zach Mayer shot 1:35 into the fifth overtime for a shorthanded goal, giving the a 3–2 victory over the 6th-seeded Union. The fifth overtime goal came at 1:10 a.m., six hours and 10 minutes after start of the game. The 141 minutes and 35 seconds set a new NCAA record for the longest played in NCAA men's hockey history. The win would become Taylor's last victory as Yale head coach after Yale's season ended with a 2-game sweep by Dartmouth in the second round of the ECAC Playoffs.

Tim Taylor was let go at the conclusion of the 2005–06 season after 28 seasons as head coach of the team. During his program leading tenure Taylor recorded 342 wins, 433 losses 55 ties; becoming the first Yale coach to eclipse the 300 win mark. He coached more games than any other ECAC coach and guided Yale to 19 ECAC playoff appearances, the 1997 Cleary Cup- awarded to the ECAC Regular Season Champion, and one NCAA Tournament appearance. In addition, he coached all six of the school's Hobey Baker Award finalists 30 years at Yale.  Taylor missed two seasons in 1984 and 1994 to coach United States Olympic Team.

Allain era (2006–present) 
In 2006 Keith Allain, a 1980 graduate of Yale, was named the school's eighth coach in program history and first new head coach in 30 years. Allain coached his first game as head coach on October 21, 2006, when Yale played McGill in an exhibition game. His first NCAA game and NCAA win came on October 27, 2006, against Holy Cross 2–1. After finishing his first season 11–17–3, Allain's Bulldogs rebounded the following season recording a 16 win season. Yale captured the Cleary Cup for ECAC Regular Season Champions in the 2008–09 season. The Bulldogs followed the regular season by sweeping Brown in the ECAC Quarterfinal Round then getting a 4–3 win over St. Lawrence 4–3. In the ECAC Championship, Yale shut out Cornell 5–0 for the program's first ECAC Playoff Championship. The win sent the Bulldogs to the 2009 NCAA Ice Hockey Tournament. After falling 1–4 to Vermont in the NCAA East Regional, Yale finished the season with a record of 24–8–2, the first 20-win season since the 1997–98 season.

The Bulldogs repeated as Cleary Cup Champions in the 2009–10 season and received an at-large bid to the 2010 NCAA Ice Hockey Tournament after falling to Brown 2 games to 1 in a best-of-three quarterfinal round of the ECAC Tournament. The third-seeded Bulldogs faced the second-seeded North Dakota in the NCAA Northeast Regional held in Worcester, Massachusetts. After starting the third period with a three-goal lead, Yale held on during a Fighting Sioux comeback to win the game 3–2. The win was the first NCAA Tournament win since 1952. In the second round of the tournament, Yale lost to Boston College in a high scoring game, 7–9.

In the 2010–11 NCAA Division I men's ice hockey rankings, the Bulldogs ranked number 1 in the poll in December 2010 for the first time in the history of the poll. Yale finished the regular season second in the ECAC but won the ECAC playoffs with a 6–0 win over Cornell in the finals. The Bulldogs advanced into their third consecutive NCAA tournament. Yale was seeded first in the 2011 NCAA Ice Hockey Tournament and placed into the East Regional, held in Bridgeport, Connecticut. In the opening round the Bulldogs came close to an upset but defeated the fourth-seeded Air Force 2–1 in overtime. The win over Air Force sent the hometown Bulldogs to the East Regional Finals where they would take on three-seeded Minnesota–Duluth.  The game would become the final game of Yale's season after Minnesota-Duluth defeated Yale 5–3 and eventually went on to win the NCAA Championship. Despite the loss, Yale finished the season 28–7–1, recording the best record in the history of the program.

In the 2012–2013 season, the Bulldogs won another Ivy League Championship. The team finished fourth in the 2013 ECAC Tournament after losing to Union 0–5 in the semifinal and falling to Quinnipiac 0–3 in the third-place match. Despite their disappointing showing in the ECAC tournament, the Bulldogs qualified for the last at-large bid in the 2013 NCAA Tournament thanks to Notre Dame's victory over Michigan in the CCHA Tournament final. In the first round of the NCAA Tournament, the 15th-seeded Bulldogs shocked 2nd-seeded Minnesota, winning 3–2 after forward Jesse Root scored 9 seconds into the overtime period, the fastest overtime goal in the history of the NCAA Tournament. The next day, the Bulldogs defeated North Dakota 4–1, earning them their first berth in the Frozen Four in 61 years. In the Frozen Four semifinal, Yale defeated University of Massachusetts Lowell 3–2 on captain Andrew Miller's overtime goal. In the final, the Bulldogs defeated 1st-overall-seeded Quinnipiac 4–0 for their first NCAA Division I National Championship. Two weeks after winning their first championship, longtime Yale coach, Tim Taylor, died at the age of 71, he had been the coach for the Bulldogs prior to Keith Allain.

The 2013–2014 season was an off-year for the Bulldogs after finishing 3rd in the Ivy League and being eliminated in the quarterfinal round of the 2014 ECAC Tournament in a 0–2 series with Quinnipiac. Yale looked to rebound in the 2014–15 season and successfully did by capturing their 12th Ivy League Championship. For the second year in a row the Bulldogs were eliminated in the quarterfinal round of the ECAC Tournament in a 1–2 series with Harvard. The Bulldogs still received an at-large bid to the 2015 NCAA Tournament thanks to Harvard's victory over Colgate in the ECAC Tournament final and Boston University's victory over University of Massachusetts Lowell in the Hockey East Tournament final. In the first round of the NCAA Tournament, the 14th-seeded Bulldogs faced off against 3rd-seeded Boston University, losing 2–3 after Terrier forward Danny O'Regan scored in the overtime period.

Season-by-season results

Source:

Head coaching record
Starting in 1998, the head coach position has been known as the Malcolm G. Chace Head Hockey Coach as a memorial to Malcolm Chace, an 1896 alumnus and the man credited with bringing ice hockey to the United States.

As of the competition of the 2022–23 season.

Note: (*) indicates former Bulldogs player

Championships

National championships

ECAC Tournament championships

ECAC regular season championships
(Known as Cleary Cup Championships)

Runners-up in 1985–86, 2010–11, 2015–16

Trophies
 Intercollegiate Champions (five times):
 1899, 1900, 1901, 1902, 1930 (Co-Champions) 
 Quadrangular League Champions (two times):
 1935, 1940
 Pentagonal League Champions (one time):
 1952
 Ivy League Champions (13 times):
 1981, 1985 (Co-Champions), 1992, 1998, 1999 (Co-Champions), 2001, 2007 (Co-Champions), 2009, 2010, 2011, 2013, 2015, 2016 (Co-Champions)
 Heroes Hat Champions: Annual Game (since 2007) played at Quinnipiac (three times):
 2011, 2012, 2015 (Co-Champions)
 Rivalry on Ice Champions: Annual Game (played from 2014 to 2015) vs. Harvard Played at Madison Square Garden (two times):
 2014, 2015

Records by opponent
Ivy League Opponents
as of the conclusion of the 2015–16 season
Note: GP = Games played, W = Wins, L = Losses, T = Ties, Win % = Win Percentage

Rivals

Ever since the Quinnipiac Bobcats moved to the ECAC, they have become one of Yale's biggest non-Ivy rivals. The rivalry is dubbed the Battle of Whitney Avenue as the two campuses are separated by a mere 8 miles on Whitney Avenue in Hamden, Connecticut, to New Haven, Connecticut. The two teams met on April 13, 2013, for the fourth time in the 2012–13 season in Pittsburgh, Pennsylvania to play for the national championship.  Although, Quinnipiac had won the previous three meetings (all in the 2012–13 season) by a combined score of 13–3, Yale shut them out in the national championship game, 4–0.

Awards and honors

Spencer Penrose Award
Tim Taylor, 1998

NCAA Tournament Most Outstanding Player
Andrew Miller, 2013

ECAC Player of the Year
Ray Giroux, D: 1998
Chris Higgins, F: 2003

ECAC Defensive Player of the Year
Ray Giroux, D: 1998
Rob O'Gara, D: 2015, 2016

Ken Dryden Award (ECAC Goalie of the Year)
Alex Westlund, G: 1998
Alex Lyon, G: 2015, 2016

ECAC Defensive Forward of the Year
Jesse Root, F: 2014
Carson Cooper, F: 2016

ECAC Rookie of the Year
Chris Higgins, F: 2002
Sean Backamn, F: 2007
Joe Snively, F: 2016

Tim Taylor Award (ECAC Coach of the Year)
Tim Taylor: 1987, 1992, 1998
Keith Allain: 2009

ECAC Sportsmanship Trophy
Yale University Bulldogs: 2015, 2016

ECAC Tournament MVP
Sean Backman, F: 2009
Ryan Rondeau, G: 2010

Ivy League Player of the Year
Dan Poliziani, F: 1982
Mike O'Neill, G: 1989
Mark Kaufmann, F: 1993
Ray Giroux, D: 1998
Jeff Hamilton, F: 1999, 2001
Brian O'Neill, F: 2012
Andrew Miller, F: 2013

Ivy League Rookie of the Year
Jeff Dwyer, D: 2001
Chris Higgins, F: 2002
Michael Karwoski, F: 2006
Sean Backman, F: 2007
Alex Lyon, G: 2014
Ryan Hitchcock, F: 2015
Joe Snively, F: 2016

Ivy League Coach of the Year
Keith Allain: 2015, 2016

AHCA First Team All-Americans
2014-14: Alex Lyon, G: Rob O'Gara, D
2002–03: Chris Higgins, F
2000–01: Jeff Hamilton, F
1997–98: Ray Giroux, D
1992–93: Jack Duffy, D
1988–89: Mike O'Neill, G
1982–83: Bob Brooke, F
1966–67: Jack Morrison, F
1958–59, Gerry Jones, G

Program records

Career
Most goals in a career: Ding Palmer, 87 (1927–30)
Most assists in a career: Andrew Miller, 114 (2009–13)
Most points in a career: Jeff Hamilton, 173 (1996–01)
Most penalty minutes in a career: John Emmons, 293 (1992–96)
 Most points in a career, defenseman: Dave Baseggio, 108 (1985–89)
Most wins in a career, Alex Lyon, 50 (2014–2016)
Most shutouts in a career, Alex Lyon, 15 (2014–2016)

Season

Most goals in a season:  Ding Palmer, 52 (1927–28)
Most assists in a season: Mark Kaufmann, 38 (1992–93)
Most points in a season: Mark Kaufmann, 63 (1992–93)
Most penalty minutes in a season: Jean-Francois Boucher, 107 (2005–06)
Most points in a season, defenseman: Ray Giroux, 39 (1997–98)
Most points in a season, freshman: Tom Walsh, 41 (1984–85)
Most wins in a season:  Ryan Rondeau, 27 (2010–11)
Most shutouts in a season: Alex Lyon, 7 (2014–15) 
Most power play goals in a season: Martin Leroux, 14 (1992–93)

Game

Most goals in a game: John Heron, 8 (vs. Columbia, 2/3/1909)
Most assists in a game: 3 players, 6 (last time: John Sather vs St. Lawrence, 111/20/1990)
Most points in a game: John Heron, 8 (vs. Columbia, 2/3/1909)

Current roster
As of September 15, 2022.

Olympians
This is a list of Yale alumni were a part of an Olympic team.

† Were members of the AHA team that was allowed to play in the Olympics but disqualified from medal contention.

Bulldogs in the NHL
As of July 1, 2022.

Source:

References

External links

 
Ice hockey teams in Connecticut
1893 establishments in Connecticut
Ice hockey clubs established in 1893